Boskone is an annual science fiction convention ("con") run by the New England Science Fiction Association (NESFA) in Boston, Massachusetts, United States. In the words of the convention organizers, "Boskone is a regional Science Fiction convention focusing on literature, art, music, and gaming (with just a dash of whimsy)". It is held every February, in Boston. The name is a reference to the Lensman series by E. E. Smith, in which "Boskone" is a council of villains, and also a name for their civilization. The obvious name for a con in Boston would, of course, be "Boscon"; the similarity was noticed and embraced. Continuing the trend, when a new Boston-area convention was formed, the organizers of that event named it "Arisia".

History 

Boskone I was held in 1941 under the auspices of The Stranger Club, an earlier Boston-based SF club.  Four more were held annually, ending with Boskone V in 1945.  The current series of Boskones started in 1965 with Boskone I again (still using Roman numerals until Boskone XXVIII and then using Arabic numerals beginning with Boskone 29) and continued without interruption to the present.  Boskones 1, 2, and 4 were run by BosSFS, the now-defunct Boston Science Fiction Society.  The then-newly formed NESFA took over with Boskone 5.  The tradition of holding Boskone in February started in 1976.

In the 1980s, Boskone exploded in popularity—gaining a reputation as the "Winter Worldcon," and surpassing the attendance of the World Science Fiction Convention in both 1985 and 1987—peaking at an attendance of 4200 for Boskone XXIV in 1987.  Seeking to pull back to a more modest convention, the organizers deemphasized movie and media-related activities and moved Boskone out of Boston to Springfield for five years and then to Framingham.  The convention would not return to Boston until 2003, and has yet to again exceed 1400 attendees.

Boskone typically features a guest of honor, an official artist, a science speaker, a featured filker, and a special guest. Boskone 48, held February 18–20, 2011, at the Westin Waterfront, featured Charles Stross as guest of honor, Gregory Manchess as official artist, Erica Neely as featured filker, and Charlaine Harris as special guest. NESFA guests include Karen Anderson and Joan Slonczewski as the Hal Clement Science Speaker. The Higgins Armory Museum and other Historical European martial arts groups have held demonstrations and classes.

See also 
 Science fiction fandom

References

External links 

 
 
 NESFA Press
 "The Rise and Fall of the Giant Boskones" by Mark L. Olson

Science fiction conventions in the United States
Culture of Boston
Recurring events established in 1941
1941 establishments in Massachusetts
Conventions in Massachusetts